John Farris (1940–2016) was an American poet and novelist who lived in the East Village neighborhood in the New York City borough of Manhattan.  He is the author of a volume of verse It's not About Time which was published by Fly by Night Press in 1993.  He is the also author of the novel The Ass's Tale published Unbearable Books.  Farris won the 2013 Acker Award in the fiction for the volume.

Farris was a member of the rag tag literary collective "The Unbearables".  Early in his career he spent some time in the orbit around the Civil Rights leader Malcolm X.

Farris died of a heart attack in January 2016 at his flat at the Bullet Space collective in the East Village of Manhattan.

A memorial celebrating Farris's life and art was held at the Judson Memorial Church in New York City on the evening of April 29, 2016.  The speakers and readers at the memorial included; Chavisa Woods, Michael Carter, Ron Kolm, Bob Holman, Andrew Castrucci, Mia Hansford, David Henderson, Steve Cannon, and several of the writer's daughters, Farris's grandson jazz saxophonist Richard Dye also performed.

A volume of his final poems is being edited for Archway Editions by Andrew Castrucci, Nicodemus Nicoludis and Chris Molnar. Excerpts from this project have appeared in Sensitive Skin and the Unpublishable anthology.

References

21st-century American novelists
20th-century American poets
Writers from Manhattan
People from the East Village, Manhattan
Place of birth missing
1940 births
2016 deaths
20th-century American novelists
Novelists from New York (state)